Luceafărul ("The Evening Star") was a Romanian-language literary and cultural magazine that appeared in three series: 1902-1914 and 1919-1920; 1934-1939; and 1941-1945. Another magazine by this name has been published by the Writers' Union of Romania since 1958.

Names associated with the first series include Alexandru Ciura, Octavian Goga, Ion Agârbiceanu, Horia Petra Petrescu, Octavian Codru Tăslăuanu, Ioan Lupaş, Aurel Paul Bănuţ and Zaharia Bârsan. It appeared in Budapest until 1906, and subsequently in Sibiu.

Notes

References
 Andreea Dăncilă, "Ipostaze ale elitei culturale româneşti din Transilvania începutului de secol XX: generaţia Luceafărului (1902-1914)", in the December 1 University of Alba Iulia's Series Historica, 14/I, 2010

External links

Luceafărul archive (digitized by the Babeş-Bolyai University Transsylvanica Online Library)

Defunct literary magazines published in Europe
Defunct magazines published in Romania
Literary magazines published in Romania
Magazines established in 1902
Magazines disestablished in 1945
Magazines published in Budapest
Romanian-language magazines